Ecrobia truncata, common name the truncated marsh hydrobia or minute hydrobia, is a species of very small aquatic snail, an operculate gastropod mollusk in the family Hydrobiidae.

Distribution
This species can be found along the coasts of Virginia, Massachusetts and Canada, the Northwest Atlantic Ocean and along the coasts of the British Isles and Scandinavia and in the Mediterranean Sea.

Description 
The maximum recorded shell length is 5.8 mm. The small shell is elongate to ovate. Its color varies between pale brown and grayish with a glassy shine. The round whorls are smooth with deep sutures. The apex is in many cases eroded. The ovate aperture is characterized by a marked lip edge.

The dark brown to almost black head shows white spots on the tentacles and on the neck and a black spot in front of each eye.

Habitat 
Minimum recorded depth is 0 m. Maximum recorded depth is 3.7 m. The minute hydrobia can be found on seaweeds and mud close to the banks of brackish marshes and estuaries.

Biology
The minute hydrobia is a secondary host of a parasitic fluke, Homalometron pallidum. This has a complex life cycle with the adult phase being found in a small fish, the mummichog, Fundulus heteroclitus.

References

 Field Guide to North American Seashells, The national Audubon Society, May 1996,

Further reading 
 Abbott, R.T. (1974). American Seashells. 2nd ed. Van Nostrand Reinhold: New York, NY (USA). 663 pp
 Linkletter, L.E. 1977. A checklist of marine fauna and flora of the Bay of Fundy. Huntsman Marine Laboratory, St. Andrews, N.B. 68 p. 
 Bromley, J.E.C., and J.S. Bleakney. 1984. Keys to the fauna and flora of Minas Basin. National Research Council of Canada Report 24119. 366 p. 
 Davis G. M., McKee M. & Lopez G. (1989). "The identity of Hydrobia truncata (Gastropoda, Hydrobiinae) — comparative anatomy, molecular-genetics, ecology". Proceedings of the Academy of Natural Sciences of Philadelphia 141: 333–359
 Brunel P., Bosse L. & Lamarche G. (1998). "Catalogue of the marine invertebrates of the estuary and Gulf of St. Lawrence". Canadian Special Publication of Fisheries and Aquatic Sciences 126: 405 p.
 Trott, T.J. 2004. Cobscook Bay inventory: a historical checklist of marine invertebrates spanning 162 years. Northeastern Naturalist (Special Issue 2): 261 - 324.

External links
 

Hydrobiidae
Ecrobia
Gastropods described in 1924